Coupar Angus railway station served the town of Coupar Angus, Perth and Kinross, Scotland from 1837 to 1967 on the Scottish Midland Junction Railway.

History 
The station opened on 24 February 1837 by the Dundee and Newtyle Railway. It first closed on 6 September 1847 but reopened on 2 August 1848 by the Scottish Midland Junction Railway. It closed again to both passengers and goods traffic on 4 September 1967. The booking office and goods shed survive.

References

External links 

Disused railway stations in Perth and Kinross
Railway stations in Great Britain opened in 1837
Railway stations in Great Britain closed in 1967
1837 establishments in Scotland
1967 disestablishments in Scotland
Beeching closures in Scotland
Former Caledonian Railway stations
Coupar Angus